Katy Stephens is a British actress and former children's presenter. She has appeared in leading roles with Shakespeare's Globe and the Royal Shakespeare Company with whom she is an Associate Artist. She played Nicky in London's Burning, and was a co-presenter on The Fun Song Factory in the 1990s.

Theatre 
Stephens’ work with the Royal Shakespeare Company includes Rosalind in As You Like It, Tamora in Titus Andronicus, Cleopatra in Antony and Cleopatra, Regan in King Lear, Petruchio in Taming of the Shrew, Sarah in Mark Ravenhill's Candide, Katy in Silence, a co-production with Filter Theatre, and Joan of Arc/Margaret of Anjou in Sir Michael Boyd's Histories Cycle. Work for Shakespeare's Globe includes Clytemnestra in The Oresteia, Calpurnia in Julius Caesar and Iras in Antony and Cleopatra for The Complete Walk films.

Other appearances include:
Agrippa in Antony and Cleopatra for the National Theatre and NT Live
Cominius in Coriolanus for Sheffield Crucible Theatre
Mrs. Arbuthnot in A Woman of No Importance Classic Spring Theatre
Lady Macbeth in Othello for Bristol Tobacco Factory Theatres
Beatrice in A View from the Bridge for Bristol Tobacco Factory Theatres.
Titania in Midsummer Night's Dream for Bath Theatre Royal.
Myrtle Logue in The King's Speech for Birmingham Repertory Theatre.
Woman in Mine for Shared Experience
Kate in Calixto Bieito's Forests
Extensive seasons at the Belgrade Theatre Coventry
Core company member of Colchester Mercury Theatre

Stephens trained at The Royal Welsh College of Music and Drama and the National Youth Theatre.

Ego Performance Company 
Stephens is a board member for Ego Performance Company, a charity working with performers of all ages and abilities in the heart of the city of Coventry.

Television 
Ellington (1994)
London's Burning (1996–1998)
Orna A short drama, played Mona (2015)

Film 
Touch (1990)
Relative Values (1999)
Prick Thy Neighbour (2014)

TV presenting 
 Fun Song Factory (1997–1998)
WOW! - That's What I Call Nursery Rhymes (1999)
WOW! - That's What I Call Christmas (1999)

References

External links 

1970 births
Living people
British stage actresses